Guilherme Clezar won the title defeating Paul Capdeville in the final 7–6(7–4), 6–3.

Seeds

Draw

Finals

Top half

Bottom half

References
 Main Draw
 Qualifying Draw

Rio Quente Resorts Tennis Classic - Singles
2012 Singles
Rio